Heart Under is the second studio album by Irish rock band Just Mustard, released on 27 May 2022 through Partisan Records.

Following on from the release of debut album Wednesday in 2018, Heart Under marked a departure from that album's shoegaze sound, with many critics describing the album as noise rock.

Background and release
On 19 November 2021, Just Mustard released the single "I Am You", which was reported to be part of the band's upcoming second album. On 23 February 2022, the band announced their second album, titled Heart Under, set to be released on 27 May, along with the release of single "Still". "Mirrors" and "Seed" were also released as singles prior to the release of the album. The album was recorded at Attica Studios in County Donegal and was self-produced, with the band stating that "they wanted Heart Under to feel like the experience of driving through a tunnel with the windows down".

Critical reception

Heart Under received critical acclaim from music critics upon its release. On review aggregator website Metacritic, Heart Under received a score of 89 out of 100 from eleven critic reviews, indicating "universal acclaim", whilst on Album of the Year, it has an average score of 85 out of 100 from 17 critic ratings.

Reviewing for the NME, Will Richards described Heart Under as "thrillingly untraditional noise rock" with the band having "left behind the shoegaze tag that has followed them around since the release of their debut" and described the band as a "a truly unique gem". Poppie Platt of The Daily Telegraph, also found Heart Under to be a departure from the group's shoegaze sound, describing it as "moody and dark, with industrial guitars and no typical choruses", in a five-star review. Max Freedman of Paste labelled the album as "a tornado of distorted dissonance", and claimed that it "places them among the vanguard of the British Isles’ ever-crowded post-punk scene".

Robin Murray, writing for Clash, described Heart Under as a "striking, fantastically original work that taps into animalistic emotion", whilst Siobhán Kane wrote in The Irish Times that it "speaks to power of resilience". Writing for The Line of Best Fit, Kyle Kohner claimed that though "the decidedly blue atmosphere of Heart Under can be a bit one-note, albeit seldomly, it still frequently froths from lips, almost unceasingly, with the type of music you wish more post-punk revivalists, bedroom pop darlings, and even some shoegaze traditionalists would aspire to make more of".

Track listing
All tracks written and performed by Just Mustard.

Personnel
Adapted from liner notes

Just Mustard
Katie Ball – vocals, tambourine
David Noonan – guitar, vocals
Mete Kalyoncuoglu – guitar
Robert Hodgers Clarke – bass guitar
Shane Maguire – drums, percussion

Additional personnel
Chris W. Ryan – engineering
David Noonan – engineering
Joe LaPorta – mastering
Graham Dean – art
Hermes Miranda – photography
Molly Keane – graphic design

Charts

References

2022 albums
Just Mustard albums
Partisan Records albums